Jean Pascal vs. Bernard Hopkins II, billed as Dynasty II, was a light heavyweight championship fight for the WBC, IBO, and The Ring light heavyweight titles. The bout was held on May 21, 2011, at Bell Centre, Montreal in Quebec, Canada and was televised on HBO.

Background
The WBC ordered a rematch between light heavyweight champion Jean Pascal and former champion Bernard Hopkins, three weeks after they fought to a highly disputed draw back in December.
The WBC's ruling, however, could have meant that Pascal, also the lineal champion, could be stripped of his alphabet title because he may have to fight Dawson in a rematch of their August fight.
When Pascal defeated Dawson by 11th-round technical decision last summer, Dawson had a rematch clause in his contract in the event of a loss.
The contract allowed both fighters to take interim bouts before the rematch was due. Dawson (29-1, 17 KOs) did not take one. However, Pascal did—and fought to the draw with Hopkins.

Dawson fought Bernard Hopkins on October 15, 2011.

Referee and Judges
The referee for the fight is British Ian John-Lewis, and the judges are Philippines' Rey Danseco, Anek Hongtongkam of Thailand, and Italy's Guido Cavalleri . John-Lewis had previously been referee for fights involving  Vitali Klitschko and Shannon Briggs fight in October 2010.

Main card

Light Heavyweight Championship  Jean Pascal vs.  Bernard Hopkins
Hopkins defeated Pascal via unanimous decision. (115-113,116-112,115-114).
Light Heavyweight bout:  Chad Dawson vs.  Adrian Diaconu
Dawson defeated Diaconu via unanimous decision. (117-111, 118-110, 116-112).

Preliminary card
Light Heavyweight bout:  Nicholson Poulard vs.  	Jaudiel Zepeda
Poulard defeated Zepeda via unanimous decision (100-90, 100-90, 100-90).
Welterweight bout:  Kevin Bizier vs.  Mauro Lucero
Bizier defeated Lucero via knockout at 3:00 in the fifth round.
Cruiserweight bout:  Eleider Alvarez vs.  David Whittom
Alvarez defeated Whittom via unanimous decision (40-36, 40-36, 40-36).
Heavyweight bout:  Oscar Rivas vs.  Zsolt Zathureczky	
Rivas defeated Zathureczky via technical knockout at 2:05  in the first round.
Heavyweight bout:  Didier Bence vs. Dwayne Storey	
Bence defeated Storey via technical knockout at 1:38 in the second round.
Light Middleweight bout:  Mikaël Zewski vs.  Ruben Galvan
Zewski defeated Galvan via knockout at 1:44  in the third round.

International broadcasting

References

External links
Pascal vs. Hopkins Official Fight Card from BoxRec
Face-Off with Max Kellerman

Boxing matches involving Bernard Hopkins
2011 in boxing
Boxing in Canada
Sport in Montreal
2011 in Quebec
Boxing on HBO
Golden Boy Promotions
May 2011 sports events in Canada